The 4th National Congress of the Kuomintang was the fourth national congress of the Kuomintang, held on 12–23 November 1931 at Nanking, Republic of China.

Results
Motions were passed in the congress to organize a conference on national calamities and set up measures to present united resistance against aggression.

See also
 Kuomintang

References

1931 in China
1931 conferences
National Congresses of the Kuomintang
November 1931 events
Politics of the Republic of China (1912–1949)